The Spotlight is a 1927 American silent comedy film directed by Frank Tuttle, written by Hope Loring, Herman J. Mankiewicz and Rita Weiman, and starring Esther Ralston, Neil Hamilton, Nicholas Soussanin, Arlette Marchal and Arthur Housman. It was released on November 19, 1927, by Paramount Pictures.

Cast   
Esther Ralston as Lizzie Stokes / Olga Rostova
Neil Hamilton as Norman Brooke
Nicholas Soussanin as Daniel Hoffman
Arlette Marchal as Maggie Courtney
Arthur Housman as Ebbetts

Production
The film is a remake of the 1921 film Footlights.

Preservation status
The Spotlight is a lost film.

References

External links 
 
 

1927 films
1920s English-language films
Silent American comedy films
1927 comedy films
Paramount Pictures films
Films directed by Frank Tuttle
American black-and-white films
American silent feature films
Lost American films
1927 lost films
Lost comedy films
1920s American films